The 1981–82 Serie A season was the 48th season of the Serie A, the top level of ice hockey in Italy. Nine teams participated in the league, and HC Bolzano won the championship.

First round

Final round

External links
 Season on hockeytime.net

Serie
Serie A (ice hockey) seasons
Italy